Acevski, also in the feminine form Acevska, is a Macedonian surname. Notable people with the surname include:

Lou Acevski (born 1977), Macedonian footballer
Ljubica Acevska, Macedonian diplomat

Macedonian-language surnames